The 1989 Pan American Gymnastics Cup was held in Victoria, Mexico, July 24–29, 1989.

Medalists

Artistic gymnastics

Rhythmic gymnastics

Results

Artistic gymnastics

Men's all-around

Women's all-around

References

1989 in gymnastics
Pan American Gymnastics Championships
International gymnastics competitions hosted by Mexico
1989 in Mexican sports